Léré may refer to the following places:

Léré, Cher, a commune in the department of Cher, France
Léré, Chad, a town in Chad
Léré, Mali, a town in Mali
Léré, Burkina Faso, a town in Burkina Faso
Lere, Nigeria, a Local government area in  Nigeria